Dubautia kalalauensis is a rare species of flowering plant in the family Asteraceae. It is endemic to Hawaii where it is known only from the island of Kauai. There is only a single known population composed of 26 plants. It was federally listed as an endangered species of the United States in 2010. Like other Dubautia this plant is known as na`ena`e.

This member of the silversword alliance was part of Dubautia laxa until 2005, when it was separated and described as a new species. The population grows in wet mountain forest habitat in the understory of ʻōhiʻa lehua (Metrosideros polymorpha) trees in Kalalau Valley on Kauai.

This plant is a shrub or tree with oppositely arranged leaves and flower heads which contain green-tinged cream-colored flowers.

References

kalala
Endemic flora of Hawaii
Biota of Kauai
Plants described in 2005